Among the world's religions, views on masturbation vary widely. Some religions view it as a spiritually detrimental practice, some see it as not spiritually detrimental and others take a situational view. Among these latter religions, some view masturbation as allowable if used as a means towards sexual self-control, or as part of healthy self-exploration, but disallow it if it is done with motives they consider to be wrong, or as an addiction. For example, Christian denominations have different views on masturbation. Today, Roman Catholic (including Eastern Catholic), Eastern Orthodox, Oriental Orthodox and some Protestant Christians consider masturbation to be a sin. Many Protestant churches in Northern and Western Europe and some Protestant churches in Northern America and in Australia/New Zealand see masturbation as not a sin.

According to Björn Krondorfer, "Auto-erotic sex became conceivable as a distinct entity among sexual sins only when the autonomous self emerged." He goes on to cite Laqueur, "Only after the Freudian revolution...did a cultural shift occur. Masturbation was now valued as an adult, non-pathological, pleasurable activity. 'Beginning in the 1950s, picking up energy with the feminism of the 1960s and early 1970s, with the subsequent sex wars, and with the worldwide gay movement of the last quarter of the century, it would become an arena of sexual politics and for art across a wide spectrum of society...Due to this cultural change across the spectrum, even theological reassessments of masturbation as a positive sexual practice were possible – though, admittedly, rare."

A 2016 Psychology Today article stated that the more religious people are, the more likely they are to restrict their sexual fantasies, have fewer sex partners, use less pornography and express stronger disapproval of the use of sex toys.

Abrahamic religions

Biblical scholarship
The biblical story of Onan (Genesis 38) is traditionally linked to referring to masturbation and condemnation thereof, but the sexual act described by this story is coitus interruptus, not masturbation. There is no explicit claim in the Bible that masturbation is sinful.

According to James Nelson, there are three interpretive examinations why Onan's act is condemned: the Onan story reflects firm "procreative" accent of the Hebrew interpretation regarding sexuality, a constant of the "prescientific mind" to consider that the child is contained in the sperm the same way a plant is contained in its seed, and masturbation as well as homosexual acts by men have been condemned more strongly than same acts by women in the Judeo-Christian tradition.

Ilona N. Rashkow states: "it is questionable whether masturbation is considered a category of 'negative' sexual activity in the Hebrew Bible" and that Leviticus 15:16 "refer to the emission rather than its circumstances." Jones and Jones state James R. Johnson's biblical view on masturbation: "treating a solitary sexual experience, whether wet dream or masturbation, as a purely ceremonial cleanliness issue and not as a matter of morality." They state: "Johnson suggests that Leviticus 15:16-18 should set the tone for our dealing with masturbation. Verses 16 and 17 say that a man who has an emission of semen should wash and be ceremonially unclean until evening. Verse 18 goes on to say that if a man and woman have intercourse, the same cleanliness rules apply. By bringing up intercourse separately, the passage surely does imply that the emission of semen in verses 16 and 17 occurred for the man individually. The passage may be referring to a nocturnal emission, or wet dream, rather than masturbation, but the passage is not specific. Johnson suggests that this Leviticus passage is significant for treating a solitary sexual experience, whether wet dream or masturbation, as a purely ceremonial cleanliness issue and not as a matter of morality. The passage also puts no more disapproval on the solitary experience than it does on intercourse. Since Christians today commonly view the Old Testament ceremonial law as no longer valid, this author suggests that masturbation is not in itself a moral concern from a biblical perspective and is no longer a ceremonial concern either."

T.J. Wray explains what the Bible actually states (and does not state) about masturbation: "Returning to the Levitical list of sexual taboos, curiously missing from the list is any mention of masturbation." She then goes on to discuss Genesis 38 and Leviticus 15, concluding that "None of this, however, represent a clear condemnation of masturbation."

Carl L. Jech states that "Masturbation is never mentioned in the Bible". M.K. Malan and Vern Bullough have stated that "nowhere in the Bible is there a clear unchallenged reference to masturbation", and that "masturbation is not mentioned in the Bible or Book of Mormon".

According to The Oxford Handbook of Theology, Sexuality, and Gender, some scholars suggest that the word 'hand' in Matthew 5:29-30, Mark 9:42-48, and Matthew 18:6-9 may imply masturbation as in the Mishnah (m. Nid. 2.1). Regarding those biblical passages, The Oxford Encyclopedia of the Bible and Gender Studies states Will Deming's view: "The sinning by eye, hand, and foot may come from a tradition of formulaic warnings against lustful gazing (by the eye), masturbation (by hand), and adultery (by 'foot', the Hebrew euphemism for genitalia)." In addition to the eye, Deming argues that "the hand plays a major role in lust as well through masturbation".

Christianity

Early church
Greek-Egyptian Church Father Clement of Alexandria (c. 150 – c. 215) writes in his Paedagogus, or The Instructor of Children:
Because of its divine institution for the propagation of man, the seed is not to be vainly ejaculated, nor is it to be damaged, nor is it to be wasted.

Scholars such as Raj Bhala and Kathryn M. Kueny say that Clement's statement includes both coitus interruptus and masturbation, the acts which make "injury to nature". "The use of spermicidal potions" is also included within it, according to Kueny. John G. Younger considers that Clement speaks about masturbation as well "masculine women and effeminate men" in his Paedagogus, make mention of violating the nature "to have sex for any other purpose than to produce children".

Apart from Clement, the fathers of the Church were practically silent on the question of masturbation, both they and pagan writers apparently regarding both masturbation and homosexuality as unimportant prior to the rise of monasticism in the 4th and 5th centuries and "paid only scant attention to masturbation and homosexual practices", Catholic academic Giovanni Cappelli undertook a study "concerning the problem of masturbation during the first millennium. Among his conclusions are: (1) Nowhere in the Old Testament or in the New is there an explicit confrontation with the issue of masturbation. (2) Cappelli does not find in the writings of the Apostolic Fathers any mention of masturbation. (3) The first explicit references to masturbation are found in the Anglo-Saxon and Celtic "penitential" of the sixth century where the subject is treated in a practical and juridical way. (4) It would be wrong, however, to interpret the silence of the Fathers about masturbation as a tacit approval of it, or as a virtual indifference." James A. Brundage offers a differing view on the fourth point. He believes that neither pagan nor early Christian writers had paid much attention to these matters because they "apparently considered them trivial."

Thomas Laqueur agrees. He notes that, "The ancient world cared little about the subject; it was a backwater of Jewish and Christian teaching about sexuality. In fact, solitary sex as a serious moral issue can be dated with a precision rare in cultural history; Laqueur identifies it with the publication of the anonymous tract Onania in about 1722. Masturbation is a creation of the Enlightenment, of some of its most important figures, and of the most profound changes it unleashed. It is modern. It worried at first not conservatives, but progressives. It was the first truly democratic sexuality that could be of ethical interest for women as much as for men, for boys and girls as much as for their elders." This is because Laqueur claims that masturbation "could only be named as such when the 'self' emerged as an autonomous being."

Giovanni Cappelli, as quoted by James F. Keenan, argues that as monastic communities developed, the sexual lives of monks came under scrutiny from two theologians, John Cassian (365–433) and Caesarius of Arles (470–543), who commented on the "vices" of the 'solitary' life. Cappelli claims that "their concerns were not with the act of masturbation, but with the monks who vowed chastity. The monks' promise made masturbation an illicit act; the act itself was not considered sinful." Keenan adds: "In fact, as Cappelli, Louis Crompton, and James Brundage each observe, prior to Cassian, masturbation was not considered a sexual offence for anyone."

Brundage states in his book that Cassian regards "masturbation and nocturnal pollution central issues in sexual morality and devoted a great deal of attention to both matters". Cassian considers "nocturnal emission" a very important problem as it is an indication of "carnal lust" and, if a monk still has not overcome it, "his religious life and his salvation might well be in peril". In the Conlationes, Cassian uses the word "uncleanness" (immunditia, as written in Colossians 3:5) as an equal substitute for both masturbation and nocturnal emissions, obviously regards masturbation as an unacceptable form of "sexual release". In the De institutis coenobiorum, he gives particular emphasis on "the sin of fornication, which includes masturbation and sexual fantasising". Brundage sees Caesarius holds similar view as Cassian. In his Sermons, Caesarius considers "any sexual longing, to say nothing of deliberate self-stimulation, a serious sin and placed it on an even footing with adultery or excessive indulgence in sex by married persons".

Catholic researchers such as Bernard Hoose and Mark Jordan suggest that claims to a continuous teaching by the Church on matters of sexuality, life and death and crime and punishment are "simply not true". Not only was there "inconsistency, contradiction and even incoherence" in the Church's doctrines but the researchers' work has led to the insight that the tradition itself is "not the truth guarantor of any particular teaching". Orthodox Catholic theologians entirely reject that claim, however, pointing to the consistency of moral teaching found in the early and later Church Fathers of the Catholic Church.

Eastern Orthodoxy
The Eastern Orthodox Church or Orthodox Christian Church views sexuality as a gift from God that finds its fulfillment in the marital relationship, and therefore the misuse of the gift of human sexuality is sinful. Because the act of masturbation is self-directed, and by its nature is incapable of expressing love and concern for another person, it is viewed as a distortion of the use of the gift of sexuality. This is especially apparent when masturbation becomes an addiction. In the least, the practice of self-pleasure is viewed as not honoring the purpose of God's gift of sexuality.

The sexual sins of fornication, adultery and masturbation, as well as hatred, jealousy, drunkenness and other sins are considered to be sins of the heart as much as the body. It is thought that turning away from sexual sin is turning away from self-indulgence for the purpose of self gratification. Instead of turning to the desires of the flesh, the Orthodox Christian turns to the Holy Spirit, whose fruit is believed to be love, joy, peace, patience, kindness, goodness, faithfulness, gentleness and self-control.

Talking about the Egyptian Gnostics related to his previous experience with them, Epiphanius of Salamis (310/320 – 403), a Byzantine Church Father and Doctor of the Church, states in his Panarion, or Medicine Chest:
They exercise genital acts, yet prevent the conceiving of children. Not in order to produce offspring, but to satisfy lust, are they eager for corruption.
John T. Noonan Jr. said that the Gnostics described by Epiphanius practiced "nonprocreative sexual acts" as a centre in their religious rituals. Epiphanius calls these practices, which include coitus interruptus, masturbation, and homosexual acts, as "the rites and ceremonies of the devil".

Oriental Orthodoxy
The Coptic Orthodox Church views masturbation as a sin because it is regarded as a "form of sexual pleasure outside of God's design". Shenoute (348-466), another Byzantine who is considered a saint in Oriental Orthodoxy, views masturbation as a sexual "misconduct" and an "outright illicit sexual activity".

Roman Catholicism
In the Catechism of the Catholic Church, the Catholic Church teaches:
By masturbation is to be understood the deliberate stimulation of the genital organs in order to derive sexual pleasure. "Both the Magisterium of the Church, in the course of a constant tradition, and the moral sense of the faithful have been in no doubt and have firmly maintained that masturbation is an intrinsically and gravely disordered action." "The deliberate use of the sexual faculty, for whatever reason, outside of marriage is essentially contrary to its purpose." For here sexual pleasure is sought outside of "the sexual relationship which is demanded by the moral order and in which the total meaning of mutual self-giving and human procreation in the context of true love is achieved."
To form an equitable judgment about the subjects' moral responsibility and to guide pastoral action, one must take into account the affective immaturity, force of acquired habit, conditions of anxiety or other psychological or social factors that lessen, if not even reduce to a minimum, moral culpability.

Although "it is said that psychology and sociology show that [masturbation] is a normal phenomenon of sexual development, especially among the young," this does not change the fact that it "is an intrinsically and seriously disordered act" and "that, whatever the motive for acting this way, the deliberate use of the sexual faculty outside normal conjugal relations essentially contradicts the finality of the faculty. For it lacks the sexual relationship called for by the moral order, namely the relationship which realizes 'the full sense of mutual self-giving and human procreation in the context of true love.'"

This is because the deliberate use of the sexual faculty outside of marriage is, according to the teaching of the Church, contrary to its primary purpose of procreation and unification of the husband and wife within the sacrament of marriage. In addition, the Church teaches that all other sexual activity—including masturbation, homosexual acts, acts of sodomy, all sex outside of or before marriage (fornication), and the use of any form of contraception or birth control—is gravely disordered, as it frustrates the natural order, purpose, and ends of sexuality.
To form an equitable judgment about the subjects' moral responsibility and to guide pastoral action, one must take into account the affective immaturity, force of acquired habit, conditions of anxiety or other psychological or social factors that lessen, if not even reduce to a minimum, moral culpability.

The Roman Catholic Church's official condemnation on masturbation for example: Pope Leo IX's Ad splendidum nitentis (1054), the decree of the Holy Office dated 2 March 1679, Pope Pius XII's Allocutio (Oct 8th, 1953), and Acta Apostolicae Sedis 48 dated 19 May 1956.

Scholars such as Robert Baker and Simon Lienyueh Wei believe that Augustine of Hippo (354–430), regards masturbation as a sin. Other scholars, Merry E. Wiesner-Hanks and Carly Daniel-Hughes, say that Augustine condemns all sexual activities that contrary to procreation including homosexual acts and masturbation—or "solitary pleasure". Carly says that Augustine also regards "mutual masturbation" as "unnatural intercourse" based on Romans 1. Isidore of Seville, another Latin Church Father and Doctor of the Church, regards masturbation as an "effeminate" habit, though the early penitential writers seem not particularly concur with him. In his Etymologiae (c. 600–625), Isidore says that by masturbation a man dishonor "the vigor of his sex by his languid body".

According to Simon Lienyueh Wei, as cited by some scholars, John Cassian and Augustine of Hippo hold that it is a sin if the nocturnal emission is the outcome of "a lustful encounter or pleasurable recollection"; otherwise, it is seen as "a physical function".

Aurélie Godefroy explains that masturbation has not always been perceived as a "mortal sin" classified as sexual deviance.

Mark W. Elliott says that Pope Gregory I (c. 540 – 604)—commonly known as Gregory the Great, a Latin Church Father and Doctor of the Church—treats Leviticus 15, which discusses ritual defilement, as "providing rules for all in the church community by relating emission to that of sexual intercourse rather than the previous monastic 'nocturnal emission' interpretation...He does, however, specify that nocturnal emissions—if caused by natural superfluity or sickness—are unproblematic for holiness, but where there is consent (i.e., masturbation) they are problematic." Making a parallel between women's menstruation and "the involuntary loss of semen", Gregory declares that "natural superfluities" do not prevent both laity and clergy to participate in the Eucharist.

Canon 8 of the Synod of the Grove of Victory from the 6th century imposes penances for "he who [has relations] between the thighs, [three] years. However, if by one's own hand or the hand of another, two years." Those acts refer to "mutual masturbation" and "femoral fornication". Another earliest set of rules which also prescribes penances for masturbation are Excerpts from the Book of St. David and Canons of John the Faster. Later, many early penitentials, such as Penitential of Finnian, Penitential of Columban, Penitential of Cummean, Paenitentiale Theodori, Paenitentiale Bedae, and the two "synods of Saint Patrick", impose penances with different levels of severity for masturbation (alone or in company) to monastics and laity.

From the sixth to the eleventh century, there are more references in the penitentials to masturbation, but it is considered with much more indulgence than the other sins of flesh. In the penitential written by Archbishop Theodore of Tarsus (seventh century), for example, "the penance is from seven days for the cleric who poured out his seed without touching himself, up to fifty days for the one who voluntarily masturbates spread in a church. Fifty days may seem a lot, but it's tiny when you know that at the same time, a young man touching a virgin woman gets a full year."

After the turn of the first millennium, more theologians began to condemn masturbation in an increasingly strident manner. Peter Damian, a Doctor of the Roman Catholic Church, in his Book of Gomorrah addressed to Pope Leo IX, wrote that masturbation is the lowest grade of homosexual sin. If left unchecked, it can "ascend by grades" to "fondling each other's male parts" (mutual masturbation), which can lead one to "fornicate between the thighs" (femoral intercourse) "or even in the rear" (anal intercourse). Thomas Aquinas, a popular Doctor of the Roman Catholic Church, writes that masturbation is an "unnatural vice," which is a species of lust like bestiality, sodomy, and pederasty, and that "by procuring pollution [i.e., ejaculation apart from intercourse], without any copulation, for the sake of venereal pleasure ... pertains to the sin of 'uncleanness' which some call 'effeminacy' [Latin: mollitiem, lit. 'softness, unmanliness']."

Pope Leo IX himself condemned masturbation more clearly, from which time it was traditionally perceived as a mortal sin, classified as a sexual deviance. But tolerance continued to be great, as the historian François Lebrun notes: "It is significant to note that [masturbation]...is of all sins against nature the only one that does not appear never in the list of reserved cases, that is to say, whose absolution is, in view of their gravity, reserved for the bishop alone. Is it not proof that it is far too common for every priest to have the possibility of absolving it immediately without referring to his superior?"

In the late medieval period, Jean Gerson wrote a confessional manual called On the Confession of Masturbation. According to researcher Chloe Taylor, this manual tells clerics to "insist that (male) penitents admit to the sin of masturbation, which...was deemed...[by this time to be an] even more serious sin than raping a nun, incest, or abducting and raping virgins and wives however more common and indeed universal (among males) a sin it was assumed to be, judging from the incredulity with which deniers of masturbation were instructed to be met..."

Taylor goes on to note that "Medieval theologians recognized that by inquiring in...suggestive detail, and with...leading questions, they ran the risk of teaching sinful behaviors to penitents who had not previously been aware of the full range of sexual possibilities available to them. They deduced, however that it was worth teaching a few young penitents how to masturbate in order to save the greater number who were already masturbating without confessing to it." She notes that, according to Gerson's book, "Even once the penitent has admitted his sin the priest is not to be satisfied, and is to ask for further details...Particularly remarkable are the instructions that the priest feign a certain casualness, and that he address the confessant with a disarming affection, calling him "friend" and pretending that masturbation is neither sinful nor shameful in order to make the penitent admit to it, insinuating that he can relate to the penitent's acts—"Friend, I well believe it"—only to then backtrack and condemn the act as sinful and shameful after all."

The laity did not undertake regular confession at this time but, "For those such as the ordained and the scrupulous who did undergo frequent and rigorous confessional examination, the obligation to confess in circumstances such as Gerson describes for even the most routine and private of sins such as masturbation came to cause anxiety...Early medieval penance was only for grave sins, but now the most mundane of sins could be given excruciating attention."

The Roman Catholic Church accused Albigensians of masturbation as part of their propaganda campaign against them.

Brundage notes that medieval "penitentials occasionally mentioned female autoeroticism and lesbianism. They treated female masturbation in much the same way as the male act, although they were more censorious of female sexual play that involved dildos and other mechanical aids than they were of male use of mechanical devices in masturbation."

Pierre Humbert states, "During the Middle Ages, masturbation - so-called "softness" - was considered an unnatural sin, but for the vast majority of theologians, priests and confessors, the offense was much less serious than fornication, adultery or sodomy; and they generally preferred not to talk too much about it so as not to suggest its existence to those who did not know about it."

According to Aurélie Godefroy, "In fact, until the eighteenth century, masturbation did not hold much of a place in the Catholic imagination, where it was most often referred to as simple interruptus coitus", while Protestants treated it much more seriously as a major deviation.

Talking about the dissident Catholic theologian Charles Curran, James J. Walter and Timothy E. O'Connell said that "as long ago as 1968, Curran used the idea [of fundamental option] as a way to make sense of the fact that the Catholic tradition has long held that masturbation is an objectively serious misuse of human sexuality even though statistical evidence suggests that the overwhelming majority of human persons — including many whose behavior otherwise suggests a generous and loving approach to life — engage in this behavior. What shall we make of this paradox?...Curran suggests that for various reasons the assertion that masturbation involves "objectively grave matter" is not convincing. In this regard, his argument is about the objective character of the action and not the nature of the moral person." Later, Curran stated in his works: "Generally speaking I believe masturbation is wrong since it fails to integrate sexuality into the service of love. Masturbation indicates a failure at a total integration of sexuality in the person. This wrongness is not always grave; in fact, more times it is not...Catholic educators should openly teach that masturbation is not always a grave matter and most times, especially for adolescents, is not that important...However, the teacher should not leave the adolescent with the impression that there is absolutely nothing wrong with masturbation." In 1986, Curran was banned to teach Catholic theology by the Prefect of the Congregation for the Doctrine of the Faith, Cardinal Joseph Ratzinger, because of his teachings on "contraception, sterilization, masturbation, divorce, and homosexuality".

A study commissioned by the Catholic Theological Society of America (CTSA) in 1972 but not approved by its board of directors when published in 1977, titled Human Sexuality: New Directions in American Catholic Thought, showed that a number of dissident Catholic theologians have come to hold that an act of masturbation should not be judged as an objective moral evil, but assessed within the life context of the person involved. Authors of the book hold similar position as Curran's, not saying that masturbation is not a sin, only that "not every deliberately willed act of masturbation necessarily constitutes the grave matter required for mortal sin." Reaction to the 1977 study showed that the dissent was not unanimous, brought about controversies inside the CTSA itself. In 1979, the Sacred Congregation for the Doctrine of the Faith publicised an advisory that deplored the books's "erroneous conclusions", identified "numerous misreadings of the teaching of the Second Vatican Council" in it, and said that the book diminished "the morality of sexual love to a matter of 'personal sentiments, feelings, [and] customs'" George Weigel restates that "these theological errors led to practical guidelines that 'either dissociate themselves from or directly contradict Catholic teaching' as taught by the Church's highest teaching authority."

While Curran might say that masturbation could be morally acceptable on certain conditions, according to Richard A. Spinello, Pope John Paul II does not say that masturbation is always immoral because "the physical act itself is wrong and disordered". He does not examine the physical act as the sole basis for moral judgment. In Veritatis splendor, John Paul II holds that "the morality of the human act" is judged by considering what one chooses rationally by "the deliberate will", and by "the proximate end". In his encyclical, he writes: "In order to be able to grasp the object of an act which specifies that act morally, it is therefore necessary to place oneself in the perspective of the acting person." Masturbation not always incurs grave sin, or mortal sin, but it can not be said that masturbation is not "gravely wrong" nor constitutes "grave matter". Joseph Farraher concludes that masturbation incurs venial sin in case "the act is performed with only partial realization or only partial choice of the will", or, in Harvey's words, "no grievous sin...while lacking in awareness, as when he is half awake, or half asleep, or when a person is carried away by sudden passion and finds himself committing the act despite the resistance of the will".

In his attempt to explain John Paul II's Theology of the Body, Anthony Percy writes in his book that "pornography and masturbation represent the destruction of the symbolic and nuptial meaning of the human body...God gives all men and women erotic energy. We call it the sex drive. This is good and it forms part of that attraction between men and women, which itself forms part of the nuptial meaning of the body. Sexual energy, therefore, needs to find its outlet in love, not lust...In masturbation that erotic energy is turned in on oneself...Masturbation, therefore, is a symbol, not of love, but of loneliness." Jeffrey Tranzillo adds to explain: "Whenever man and woman employ the body to simulate love or authenticity for reasons that are ultimately self-serving and hence destructive of self and others, they falsify the language it was created to speak. That is what underlies the sin of adultery." He says that "such misuse of the body also underlies other sexual sins like contraception, masturbation, fornication, and homosexual acts".

Protestantism 
According to Brian F. Linnane, "until the twentieth century, the actual moral norms for sexual behavior were similar for both Protestants and Roman Catholics, although the justifications for these norms might...be quite dissimilar...For both groups, sexual expression was confined to lifetime, monogamous, heterosexual marriage. Premarital sex, adultery, homosexual relations, masturbation, and the use of birth control were all proscribed by the Christian churches". Rainer Brandes notes, "For a long time Protestant theology has placed sexuality exclusively at the service of reproduction." Adrian Thatcher says that Protestants historically regarded masturbation as a sin, though they "appeal directly to the Bible whenever possible".

Protestant reformers such as Martin Luther, the founder of the Lutheran Churches, as well as John Calvin, the founder of the Reformed Churches, condemned masturbation in their works. Likewise, a forerunner of the reformers, Girolamo Savonarola, believed that masturbation was a mortal sin.

Lutheranism
Martin Luther, the Protestant Reformer, regarded masturbation to be immoral. He wrote that he "pitied those poor girls and young men who are tormented in the flesh at night."

Luther saw masturbation as a sin more terrible than heterosexual rape since such rape was considered to be "in accordance with nature", while masturbation was "unnatural". He also viewed masturbation and coitus interruptus the same act as killing children before they have a chance to be born, therefore, for him, masturbation was basically the same as abortion.

Luther argued that the marital act is a way to avoid the sin of masturbation: "Nature never lets up...we are all driven to the secret sin. To say it crudely but honestly, if it doesn't go into a woman, it goes into your shirt."

Luther, citing the apostle Paul, makes his case: ""For is it better to marry than to be aflame with passion." I have no doubt that everyone who wants to live chastely, though unmarried and without special grace for it, will understand these words and what they convey. For St. Paul is not speaking of secret matters, but of the common, known feeling of all those who live chastely outside of marriage but do not have the grace to accomplish it. For he ascribes this flaming with passion to all who live chastely but without the necessary grace, and prescribes no other medicine than marriage. If it were no so common or if there were none other advice to be given, he would not have recommended marriage. This thing is known in German as "the secret disease," but this expression would not be so common either if the ailment were truly rare...There can also be no doubt that those who have the grace of chastity still at times feel evil desires and are tempted. But it is transitory, therefore their problem is not this burning. In short, "aflame with passion" is the heat of the flesh, which rages without ceasing, and daily attraction to woman or to man; we find this wherever there is not desire and love for chastity. People without this heat are just as few and far between as are those who have God's grace for chastity. Now such heat is stronger in some, and weaker in others. Some among them suffer so severely that they masturbate. All these ought to be in the married estate...If they relieve themselves outside of marriage, then the pangs of conscience are soon there, and this is the most unbearable torment and the most miserable of earthly estates. This is the unavoidable result, that most of those who live without marriage and without grace in celibacy are forced to sin bodily in unchastity, and the others are forced to outward chastity and inward unchastity. The former must needs lead a damnable life, the latter an unholy useless one. And where are the spiritual and secular rulers who consider the plight of these poor souls? Every day they are helping the devil to increase this misery with their pressures and compulsion."

In his writing on 1 Thessalonians 4:3–5 ("It is God's will that you should be sanctified: that you should avoid sexual immorality; that each of you should learn to control your own body in a way that is holy and honorable, not in passionate lust like the pagans, who do not know God;"), Luther advises that, "All young people should...resolve to strengthen themselves against lust and sexual passions by reading and meditating on a psalm or some other portion of God's Word...If your sexual appetites continually tempt you, be patient. Resist them as long as necessary, even if it takes more than a year. But above all, keep praying! If you feel that you can't stand it any longer, pray that God will give you a devout spouse with whom you can live in harmony and true love...I have known many people who, because of their crude and shameful fantasies, indulged their passion with unrestrained lust. Because of their insatiable desires, they abandoned self control, and lapsed into terrible immorality. In the end, they had to endure dreadful punishment."

Immanuel Kant, (who was raised as a Pietist), when writing on masturbation, argued that "...the question here is whether the human being is subject to a duty to himself with regard to this enjoyment, violation of which is a defiling (not merely a debasing)" of the humanity in his own person. The impetus to this pleasure is called carnal lust (or also simply lust). The vice engendered through it is called lewdness; the virtue with regard to this sensuous impulse is called chastity, which is to be represented here as a duty of the human being to himself. Lust is called unnatural if one is aroused to it not by a real object but by his imagining it, so that he himself creates one, contrary to [natural] purpose; for in this way imagination brings forth a desire contrary to nature's end, and indeed to an end even more important than that of love of life itself, since it aims at the preservation of the whole species and not only of the individual. That such an unnatural use (and so misuse) of one's sexual attribute is a violation of duty to oneself, and indeed one contrary to morality in its highest degree, occurs to everyone immediately, with the thought of it, and stirs up an aversion to this thought to such an extent that it is considered indecent even to call this vice by its proper name. But it is not so easy to produce a rational proof that unnatural, and even merely unpurposive, use of one's sexual attribute is inadmissible as being a violation of duty to oneself (and indeed, as far as its unnatural use is concerned, a violation in the highest degree). — The ground of proof is, indeed, that by it man surrenders his personality (throwing it away), since he uses himself merely as a means to satisfy an animal impulse. But this does not explain the high degree of violation of the humanity in one's own person by such a vice in its unnaturalness, which seems in terms of its form (the disposition it involves) to exceed even murdering oneself. It consists, then, in this...unnatural lust, makes man not only an object of enjoyment but, still further, a thing that is contrary to nature, that is, a loathsome object, and so deprives him of all respect for himself."

In Germany during the Weimar Republic period, there were Protestant societies for moral purity that opposed masturbation. In the Adenauer era, there was very strict sexual morality in the Church. However, at the end of the 1960s, Protestant theologians set about redefining human sexuality. Siegfried Keil emerged as a leading figure in this movement but even he continued to oppose masturbation, seeing it as immoral. However, in 1971, the Church published its "Denkschrift zu Fragen der Sexualethik" ("Memorandum on Issues of Sexual Ethics"), which took an extremely liberal position on masturbation. Sexologist Volkmar Sigusch claimed the positions in the memorandum read like they could have been written by liberal sex education teachers, rather than by pastors and theologians. Despite this liberalization, there was a growing alienation between the Church and faithful in the 1970s as people no longer turned to the church for advice on sexual morality but to doctors and sexual magazines. This was a dramatic shift from the 1950s, when the Churches had dominated the field of public and private morality in Germany. In the 1960s, theologians had been either criticised or respected by the media as moral figures but now they were simply ignored. However, the liberalization of the theologians and the pastors chiefly served to brand the majority view in the Church as backward-looking and traditionalist.

Despite its liberalism, the 1971 memorandum still forbade sex outside of marriage, pornography usage and group sex. Sigusch wrote, "Protestant ethics disqualifies most sexual relations. the unmarried have today...[However] the attitudes of the Lutheran Church in Germany (EKD) memorandum on masturbation, contraception, [and] various sexual practices...are...largely liberal...Sexually deviant behaviors enjoy tolerance." There has not been another memorandum on sexuality since that time, despite an attempt to draft one between 2010 and 2015.

Today, Frank Muchlinsky and Maike Weiß of the EKD argue that masturbation is not a sin.

Despite its official liberalism, the EKD contains Christians with a much more conservative view of sexuality. A 2015 academic study found that although Germany is a relatively sexually-liberal country and that young people's viewing of pornography is linked to masturbation, pornography use is lower amongst religious youth. The authors of the study found that "...organizational religious activity was negatively associated with pornography use. Participants attending church or other religious meetings on a regular basis were older at their first exposure (weak association) and used pornography less often (strong association). This result confirmed findings from previous research on associations between religiosity and sexual behaviour: frequent attendance of religious services is generally related to greater sexual abstinence, fewer lifetime sexual partners, delayed age of sexual debut and lesser likelihood of premarital sex...We also found a negative relationship between non-organizational religious activity and current pornography engagement (relatively large effect). Spending time in private religious activities, such as prayer, meditation, or Bible study, was associated with lower frequency of pornography use in the last six months...In agreement with the findings in several previous studies...we found that religious attendance was negatively associated with pornography use."

There are ongoing debates about sexual ethics between liberal and conservative pastors in the German church.

The sexually-liberal Church of Sweden argues that masturbation is not a sin. The church's pastors frequently address the issue in confirmation classes for adolescents. The Evangelical Lutheran Church of Finland also has a positive view of masturbation, noting that it provides a secure approach to sex for single people by reducing the temptation to drift into promiscuity. The Lutheran churches in the Scandinavian countries are known for being, generally speaking, sexually very liberal compared with, for example, the Lutheran churches in the Baltic states, which are more traditional.

The Evangelical Lutheran Church in America Metropolitan Chicago Synod believes that masturbation is sinful.

The conservative Lutheran Church–Missouri Synod's Commission on Theology and Church Relations says the following regarding masturbation: "To view our sexuality in the context of a personal relationship of mutual love and commitment in marriage helps us to evaluate the practice. Chronic masturbation falls short of the Creator's intention for our use of the gift of sexuality, namely, that our sexual drives should be oriented toward communion with another person in the mutual love and commitment of marriage."

The Wisconsin Evangelical Lutheran Synod has said the following regarding masturbation: “Masturbation is self-stimulation to some form of arousal and climax. God gave sex as a gift and a blessing to human beings for marriage with a life-long partner of the opposite sex. Self-stimulation is a corruption of God’s gift and blessing of sex.”

Doctor John Kleinig, Lecturer Emeritus at the Australian Lutheran College, argues that, "The regular use of pornography for masturbation is a kind of sexual addiction. When Paul speaks about impurity and sexual greed as idolatry in Ephesians 5:3-7 and Colossians 3:5, he accurately describes how it works. It begins with sexual impurity, the defilement of our imagination by depictions of sexual intercourse that present naked bodies as idols for us to admire. Our fixation on these images arouses disordered desires and make us more and more greedy for sexual satisfaction from things that God has not given to us for our enjoyment. Yet they fail to satisfy us and serve only to feed our growing appetite for them...Where masturbation is involved...the more ashamed we become, the more secretive we become; the more secretive we become and the more we hide in the darkness, the more vulnerable we become to the accusation and condemnation of Satan...You need to be careful that Satan does not distort your perception by making a fool of you and getting you to focus on the wrong thing. Nowhere in the Bible is masturbation explicitly forbidden. There is good reason for this because the problem does not come from masturbation, which is in itself neither good or bad, but the adulterous sexual fantasies that accompany it, as Christ makes clear in Matthew 5:28. That's the problem spiritually!...That's how Satan gets a hold on us through our imagination. If you use pornography to masturbate, you put another woman, an idol that promises heaven and gives you hell, sexually, in the place of your wife. It arouses your greed for what you don't have, greed for what God has not given for you to enjoy, greed that increases as you give in to it. The more you indulge it, the more dissatisfied and empty you become."

Reformed
John Calvin, the founder of the Reformed tradition (which includes the Continental Reformed, Presbyterian, Congregationalist, and many Anglican Churches), taught that the Onan passage actually condemned coitus interruptus. In his Commentaries on Genesis (1554), Calvin teaches that "the voluntary spilling of semen outside of intercourse between a man and a woman is a monstrous thing. Deliberately to withdraw from coitus in order that semen may fall on the ground is double monstrous." Nevertheless, Calvin was strongly against masturbation.

For Reformed Christians, masturbation came to be considered, as early as the 17th century, a major deviation, as evidenced by the writings of the Calvinist Richard Capel: "The pollution of oneself is the worst and most polluting of sins of impurity." Protestants at this time looked on masturbation much more seriously than Roman Catholics did.

According to Humbert, "Protestants, by rediscovering the Bible, had brought up to date the Old Testament notions of the Jewish religion, and among them the requirement of purity...In the Calvinist exegesis of the Bible, children were affected from the moment of their birth by original sin, so that parents had to start early to give them a strict education on proper morals. In this context, it explains the insistence to eradicate the slightest caress observed, the least weakness, and this from the youngest age." The Swiss Calvinists had a frantic quest for purity, and regarded gratuitous sexual pleasure an abomination.

Calvin's views permeated Geneva and influenced the way Huguenots thought about masturbation. For instance, "For Rousseau the puritanical moralist and citizen of the theocratic republic founded by John Calvin, masturbation is exclusively the activity of an inflamed erotic imagination; it is not a legitimate or acceptable expression of sexuality, but a perverted and sterile self-indulgence that saps one's energies and destroys one's mental and physical health."

In the United States, the influence of Calvin and the Puritans on perceptions of female sexuality, including masturbation, was gradually eroded from the latter part of the eighteenth century and early nineteenth century onwards: "the birth control movement, the women's suffrage campaign, the Free Love Movement, and finally the need for female labor in factories began to counterbalance the influence of John Calvin, the Mathers and "Mrs Grundy.""

Calvinists were renowned for their moral rigor and strict adherence to their interpretation of Biblical standards of morality. Indeed, "Churches fashioned in the Calvinist tradition have typically set extremely high standard of behavior."

The traditionalist Calvinist pastors of the United Protestant Church of France (EPUdf), believe that masturbation is a sin, stating, "Masturbation...is not one of the prohibitions of God, so it can not be said that the Bible clearly defines masturbation as a sin. However, the Bible unquestionably presents the place of sexual life in the context of a committed and faithful couple (see Matthew 19:12). And it exhorts us to have our actions and thoughts meet this ideal. The masturbatory practice and the thoughts that may accompany it obviously do not correspond to this ideal, and are in this sense sin. Of course, we do not always answer the perfection to which God calls us...but to seek perfection is the call of the Christian, to give glory to God (1 Corinthians 6:20) because this is our vocation as men created in the image of God, and the way of life for today and in the perspective of eternity. Masturbation is not the act of an accomplished Christian, called to live the blessing of marriage and to fulfill his partner in this setting (1 Corinthians 7:5)."

In contrast, a more liberal strand of EPUdf thinking is represented by the L'Oratoire du Louvre in Paris. According to its website, this parish believes that masturbation is not sinful, providing that the act is not done in a spirit of rebellion against God and providing that it does not become addictive.

In Switzerland, the liberal Calvinist theologians Michel Cornuz, Carolina Costa and Jean-Charles Bichet have all said that masturbation is not a sin, provided that the use of pornography is not involved.

In a 1991 report on human sexuality, the Presbyterian Church (USA) declared that "churches need to repudiate historically damaging attitudes toward masturbation and replace them with positive affirmations of the role of masturbation in human sexuality."

The Tenth Presbyterian Church of Philadelphia which is affiliated with the more conservative Presbyterian Church in America argues, in contrast with the PC USA, that masturbation is a sin.

The Protestant Church in the Netherlands' Doctor G. A. van Ginkel stated, when asked if it was sinful to masturbate if you are unmarried and you are fantasising about an unmarried girl, "What is all-important is that you see your body as not of yourself. Your life belongs to the Lord! Your body is a temple of the Holy Spirit. God hates uncleanness. That may sound harsh, but God's Word speaks clearly when it comes to that. It would be best if you could project your desire in sincere love and faithfulness to her that God gives you!...But there's a problem there. You do not have her. You are not married. And maybe you do not want a woman out of God's hand at all!? You want to project your sexual fantasy on an unmarried woman. In your mind "do it" with her. Focused on yourself. However understandable, this is not a good solution...You seek biblical legitimacy and believe it to be in the fact that the Bible does not speak about self-gratification. (The passage about the sin of Onan does indeed have nothing to do with self-gratification.) But the Bible does speak out about a holy and God-focused life. Paul writes to the church in Corinth: All that you do, do it to the glory of God. Thinking of this Word alone, you have no biblical legitimacy for your sexual projections. Pray for God on your side, with whom you may live life to the honor of His Name. This includes your sexual life! This is desirable!"

The American conservative Calvinist website, Reformed Answers, argues that masturbation is only sin if it entails lustful fantasies for someone other than the person's spouse: "...if an act of masturbation expresses the sin of lust, then that act of masturbation can be condemned as sinful. But this argument cannot condemn acts of masturbation that do not give expression to the sin of lust." The site notes that masturbation can only be opposed on moral grounds, not natural ones: "Some argue that masturbation is wrong on the basis of nature. That is, in a fashion similar to the argument based on Onan's sin, they argue that God did not design the human body and reproductive system to work in this manner, that God's general revelation in nature condemns the practice. This is a tenuous argument at best. In fact, there is some evidence to the contrary. For example, many human beings learn to masturbate without ever having been taught it or having heard about it. It would seem to be their "natural" impulse. Moreover, human beings are naturally equipped with the necessary body parts to accomplish masturbation (unlike most animals). It could be argued on these bases that it is natural. Moreover, most Protestants reject the idea that what is natural is necessarily what is good—especially in light of our "sin nature." This is simply a poor ground on which to base the argument against masturbation."

The American Reformed author Jay E. Adams argues that "masturbation is clearly wrong since it constitutes a perversion of the sexual act", citing 1 Corinthians 7:3-4 to support his argument.

Another American, Puritan Publications' C. Matthew McMahon, argues, "...if any form of sin is a product of lust, then it is an evil and wicked action. If a man masturbates while watching a sensual movie, then he has sinned. When masturbation grows out of a sense of this need for physical release due to unclean thoughts, it is sin. This is easily understood and biblically undeniable...Self-love, turning to lust, is at the heart of masturbation...Instead, the Christian man must set in motion an attitude of holiness and purity, instead of uncleanness and defilement. When he does this, he then "practices what he preaches." Though he says that holiness is right and good, he has to live that way as well. The question arises and must be answered "Is masturbation itself condemned?...Is it, in and of itself, a sin? I am biblically persuaded that masturbation...can only be achieved through lust"

McMahon also states, "The need for a Biblical treatment of lust and masturbation is necessary. Satan has conveniently disguised this "awful" topic as something that ought not to be mentioned, and never to be preached. The church's response to this is a deafening silence...The topic of lust may sometimes be alluded to, but never developed into the precise "doctrine" of the Bible's teaching on lust and masturbation, which really develops into a study on the fruit of the Spirit (love to Christ more than "self", and self-control)...Since we are in desperate need for Biblical teaching on this subject, we turn to the church to teach us what it means to be sexually pure. But, Christian men who struggle with this sin have little practical help from their local church."

What is clear is that Calvinists oppose "sexual touching" (including mutual masturbation) between unmarried parties, even if they are engaged to each other. This is because it is a form of fornication.

Anglicanism
The Church of England does not have a position on whether masturbation is a sin or not.

Historically, in 1948, a writer for the Church Times could still say, "Masturbation is condemned by all Christian moralists because it implies the solitary and essentially individualistic use of sexual activities intended to be used in association. It disregards the truth that with these powers God provides physiological means for exercising them in a joint and common act."

In 1945, an Archbishop's Commission was appointed to study the issue of artificial human insemination. The resulting report, published in 1948, "discusses the legitimacy of masturbation in this context and concludes that although masturbation impairs the natural unity of the sexual act, its use as a last resort is justifiable. 'The act which produces the seminal fluid, being in this instance directed towards the completion (impossible without it) of the procreative end of the marriage, loses its character of self abuse. It cannot in this view, be the will of God that a husband and wife should remain childless merely because an act of this kind is required to promote conception.'"

In his letter to a Mr Masson dated 6 March 1956, C.S. Lewis writes: "For me the real evil of masturbation would be that it takes an appetite which, in lawful use, leads the individual out of himself to complete (and correct) his own personality in that of another (and finally in children and even grandchildren) and turns it back; sends the man back into the prison of himself, there to keep a harem of imaginary brides...Masturbation involves this abuse of imagination in erotic matters (which I think bad in itself) and thereby encourages a similar abuse of it in all spheres. After all, almost the main work of life is to come out of our selves, out of the little dark prison we are all born in. Masturbation is to be avoided as all things are to be avoided which retard this process. The danger is that of coming to love the prison."

The conservative Anglican Diocese of Sydney believes that masturbation "can help us find sexual release when we cannot control our desire nor satisfy it through a marital relationship and in this sense it can be helpful." However, the Diocese notes that it can become associated with sin if it leads to either the consumption of pornography or to looking lustfully at people in real life in order to fuel fantasies. They warn that either of these can, in turn, suck someone into a cycle that cannot be controlled. The site goes on to note, "Jesus condemns looking at women or girls in order to lust after them. (Matt 5:28) So perving...which lots of 17 year old guys would treat as normal, is a sin and offends God. It's easy to get sucked into a cycle which fuels sexual desire to the point where it can't be controlled...When masturbation leads to unhelpful sexual thinking and lust you are sinning and need to do something about it. Make the conscious, aggressive decision to look somewhere else, or go somewhere else, or turn the computer off or whatever it takes! Jesus promises that when we are being tempted, he'll give us a way out. (1 Cor 10:13). Ultimately I think that it is much better to resist the temptation to masturbate." (The 1998 Lambeth Conference's Resolution I.10 says that the use of pornography is sinful and includes it in a list of the forms of sexual activity inherently contrary to the Christian way of life. Masturbation itself is not mentioned in the resolution at all, either in positive or negative terms.)

Methodism
John Wesley, founder of Methodism, as quoted by Bryan C. Hodge, believed that "any waste of the semen in an unproductive sexual act, whether that should be in the form of masturbation or coitus interruptus, as in the case of Onan, destroyed the souls of the individuals who practice it". Wesley considered masturbation an unacceptable way to release "sexual tension". Like his contemporaries, he believed that many people had become badly sick and even died because of "habitual masturbation". He argued that "nervous disorders, even madness, could be caused by another form of bodily excess – masturbation." He wrote his Thoughts on the Sin of Onan (1767), which was reproduced as A Word to Whom it May Concern in 1779, as an attempt to censor a work by Samuel-Auguste Tissot. In that document, Wesley warned about "the dangers of self pollution", these being the bad physical and mental effects of masturbation, records many such cases along with the treatment recommendations.

Dale Kaufman, a clergyman in the Free Methodist Church, teaches:

The United Methodist Church does not have an official position on masturbation.

The Uniting Church in Australia teaches that "masturbation is an important part of childhood and adolescent discovery and sexual development. It should not be stigmatised." However, the Church has long been wracked by controversies and divisions over sexuality. "The Church's Interim Report on Sexuality...was released in May 1996. It became arguably the most explosive document in the UCA's short history. The report was bound to be controversial for some given it spoke positively about the ordination of homosexual ministers, suggested pre-marital sex was not 'living in sin' and described masturbation as a "natural sexual activity (which) can be a positive experience". Not only did it attract much debate from within the Church but also from the mainstream media, which covered it – and the fallout – extensively. In the following months Crosslight [the Uniting Church's magazine] was flooded with letters of complaint about the report and its authors...The Church received more than 8000 responses to the report with almost 90 per cent – representing the views of 21,000 members – negative."

During the debates, former Assembly of Confessing Congregations chair Rev Dr Max Champion "argued that any proposal to change the Church's current position...needed to be grounded in theology, something he did not believe had occurred...Dr Champion said he believed there had been a shift in thinking from some within the Church who had moved away [from Biblical positions]...to arguing for diversity to be the main theological base."

Pentecostalism
A Church of Christ in Tulsa, United States, has also taken the view that "Masturbation is not mentioned in the Bible and isn't the same thing as sexual immorality. The historical church has had difficulty explaining this practice, but there is no good reason to lump it with sexual immorality and heap guilt on single people in particular...For most males and females, masturbation is a natural part of self exploration. However, masturbation can program us to think sex can be done alone. Coupled with pornography, we get two steps away from married sexual love...The warning is for masturbation not to become an obsession that impacts your conscience, future sex life, and leads you into fantasizing with pornography."

A Swedish Pentecostal pastor, Christian Mölk, also says that the Bible does not explicitly mention masturbation as a sin. He notes that Onan's sin was about failing to do his duty under the Levirate law mentioned in Deu 25:5-6. Under this law it was "the closest brother's duty to ensure that his family survived by marrying the widow. When Onan "spilled his seed on the earth," it means that he refused to get a seed to his brother and instead utilized his brother's widow for his own sexual pleasure." He goes on to note that another text which is sometimes invoked is Matthew 5:27-30. Here, he says, Jesus is simply warning that it is not only wrong to cheat in one's action but also that it is wrong to cheat in one's heart. Therefore a person should not look with lustful intent at someone else's wife. He says these texts are not about masturbation and that the Bible does not explicitly mention that masturbation is a sin.

Another Swedish Pentecostal, Christer Åberg, has written about the practice on a Welsh language site. He states, "First of all, nowhere is masturbation discussed in the Bible...But is masturbation a sin? As I understand it, it is not a sin. The answer is "no." But it can lead to sin, so, therefore, I think one should be careful with it. I mean if a guy masturbates and fantasizes with desire for a girl, it will be wrong...It's really like everything: It's not a sin to drink alcohol, but it can lead to sin if you drink yourself drunk. Nor is it a sin to dance, but it can lead to sin, etc., etc. The Bible says that "Everything is legal to me, but not everything is beneficial. Everything is granted to me, but I will not let anything take power over me." (1 Corinthians 06:12)." In a follow-up article, he wrote, "Some time ago, I wrote an article about masturbating and surprised some. I wrote that it was not too bad to masturbate, but it could lead to sin. Maybe the best advice in today's society is to help with masturbation. I think of an article in the Expressen newspaper about a "masturbation competition". This is a clear example that it can open you up to an evil influence, and lead you to sin. We live in a time when it is important to lead a clean and devoted life to Jesus Christ. For you, live near Jesus so that you do not risk going wrong. And then you will have no interest to try the things of this "good" world."

The Texan Pentecostal pastor and church founder, Tom Brown, has written on the subject of "Is Masturbation a Sin?", stating that "Masturbation has been around for a long time, and since God does not clearly condemn it, I would not be too bothered with it, either. Masturbation is practiced far more than adultery or fornication, yet God is practically silent on the issue. This ought to tell you that God is not overly concerned with it...However, let me caution you against addiction to masturbation. Just like most things, masturbation can turn into an addiction...Paul said, "'Everything is permissible for me'—but I will not be mastered by anything" (1 Cor 6:12). This includes masturbation. Also, you should never use pornography to masturbate...Concerning single people, I have no advice other than a prohibition [on] pornography."

He goes on to note, "If a believer uses masturbation to alleviate sexual temptation, that's far better than actually being tempted to commit fornication or adultery. I would rather have a man masturbate than go to a prostitute...Another thought, if masturbation is sinful, then you would expect there to be bad health consequences to it, such as found in adultery, homosexuality, and fornication (diseases for one thing). Instead, research has found that masturbation serves to release sexual tension."

Anabaptists
A 2011 article in Canadian Mennonite magazine notes that Anabaptists, such as Mennonites, have always historically had a sex-negative attitude but goes on to state that "Masturbation is one of the most common sexual experiences across the spectrums of age, culture, partnered and single life situations, and genders...Finding pleasure in our own God-given bodies can be good...[but]if it draws someone away from God, then for God's sake, don't do it. But we ought to release the stranglehold of guilt formerly associated with the practice of self-pleasuring." (The article also argues that Anabaptists should commit themselves to avoiding pornography for a wide variety of reasons).

Baptists
Southern Baptist Convention cleric David Platt in the Baptist Press declared that masturbation "goes against the design of God" and that "God designed sex to be relational; masturbation is lustful". The Baptist publication characterized masturbation as "isolating, noncommittal and self-centered."

Quakers
In 1960, the British Friends Home Service published a pamphlet on marriage that was read and approved on both sides of the Atlantic that stated that "Masturbation as a child is healthy, but not as an adult." However, four years later, in 1964, the Quaker physician, Dr. Mary Calderone, argued for the emerging view that masturbation was a normal useful means for "relieving natural tension in a healthy and satisfying way."

More recently, Quakers, while formulating a testimony on sexual intimacy, have noted that "one possibility for a testimony of intimacy is a pronatalist position that is focused on the imperative to have children. This is a long-standing position of the Roman Catholic Church and a teaching that has considerable sway among many Protestant Evangelicals...In this teaching, [the] main purpose [of sex] is procreation...In this pronatalism, masturbation is...wrong, as is contraception, but there are no clear scriptural texts against these practices. Their prohibition is taken to follow from the central teaching that the purpose of sex is the creation of legitimate offspring...For several reasons, Friends are likely to feel uncomfortable with this pronatalist framing of the morality of intimate relationships.
For many Friends, the most serious objection of all...would be pronatalism's steadfast focus on increasing the population. With seven billion human beings alive today on planet Earth, further population increase should hardly be the predominant emphasis informing relationships of intimacy. Yet the central warp thread of this teaching is the urgency of procreation."

Inter-denominational
In 1994, members of the Christian Medical Fellowship debated in a journal article whether or not masturbation is a sin.

The Australian non-denominational Christian teen sex education website, "Boys Under Attack", argues that masturbation is not a sin, provided that it does not become addictive, does not involve the use of pornography and is done alone, not with another person or group of people. The site refers to teachings by James Dobson and an American Lutheran pastor on the matter.

Journalists for Ekklesia, a Nigerian non-denominational magazine, argue that masturbation is a sin: "Masturbation (sex with self or auto sex) is usually carried out with the intention of releasing tension and getting sexual satisfaction without "sinning" with another person. Apart from the fact that it violates a basic rule of lovemaking which is genital union, masturbation is often in response to a sexual fantasy. That sexual fantasy could be borne out of exposure to pornographic materials. We learn from Philippians 4:8 on how we are to use our minds. Within that context, masturbation qualifies to be called a sin...Finally, as with every other sin, masturbation leads to spiritual weakness and loss of intimacy with God."

In the 1940s, Evangelical sex advice books advised against masturbation, considering it a very serious sin, but such warnings disappeared from the books during the 1960s, "because evangelicals who noticed that the Bible said nothing directly about masturbation believed that they had made a mistake to proscribe it." Also, they considered that masturbating is preferable to falling into "sex and drugs and rock 'n' roll".

One of the most prominent American evangelical leaders, James Dobson, has stated: "Christian people have different opinions about how God views this act. Unfortunately, I can't speak directly for God on this subject, since His Holy Word, the Bible, is silent on this point." He also stated: "The Bible says nothing about masturbation, so we don't really know what God thinks about it. My opinion is that He doesn't make a big issue of it." He also stated "Despite terrifying warnings given to young people historically, it does not cause blindness, weakness, mental retardation, or any other physical problem. If it did, the entire male population and about half of females would be blind, weak, simpleminded, and sick."

Others make a distinction between masturbation and sexual fantasy. Richard D. Dobbins proposes that it is permissible for teenagers to fantasize about their future spouse during masturbation.

Garry H. Strauss, a psychologist counseling the students at Biola University in the United States, wrote that there is no mention of masturbation in the Bible, therefore masturbation is permissible, but pornography and sexual fantasies are not permissible.

Two Evangelical scholars, Alex W. Kwee and David C. Hooper, addressed the issue in an academic paper. They note that "The Bible presents no clear theological ethic on masturbation...Of the many aspects of human sexuality that we address in our work, masturbation ranks as the most misunderstood for the lack of open, rational dialogue about this topic within the Christian community...Within evangelical frameworks of sexual ethics...there has never been a well-defined theological ethic of masturbation, in contrast to the ethics of pre-marital sex, marriage, and divorce that are worked out from foundational Christian anthropological assertions about gender, sexuality, and their relationship to the imago Dei...Masturbation falls thus within the proverbial grey area of evangelical sexual ethics."

They go on to note that "we find that the questions that Christian young people ask about masturbation can be reduced to two essential queries. Christian youth want to know whether masturbation is "right or wrong" (i.e., what is the "correct" moral stance to take based on what the Bible says?), and whether masturbation is "normal" (i.e., what can we say about the psychological dimensions of masturbation?)"

Answering the first question, they note that "The Bible does not directly address masturbation, leaving Christians to articulate a moral stance from various scriptures that in our view cannot support a deontological prohibition of masturbation...Today the general consensus in the Christian community is that Genesis 38:6-10 is irrelevant to masturbation. Modern readers of course understand Onan's act not as masturbation but as coitus interuptus. The technical designation of the act, however, is unimportant compared to the ethical violations manifesting through the act. The interpretive context for Genesis 38:6-10 is found in the ancient Israelite law (Deuteronomy 25:5-10)...Whatever his reasons for not consummating intercourse, Onan was punished for violating a specific Hebrew law and for failing in his covenantal duty to his deceased brother. Onan was judged for undisclosed but probably exploitative intentions...and certainly for his callous repudiation of his traditional obligations of familial care and responsibility."

They state also that "Our...objection to using Matthew 5:27-30 as a basis for the blanket condemnation of masturbation is that such an interpretation can only be supported by de-contextualizing this passage from Jesus' overall message...[and]...proper contextual interpretation of Leviticus 15:16-18 would therefore support the view that masturbation in and of itself is morally neutral."

They note that "There is a moral difference between masturbation done in the presence of pornography or the phone sex service (inherently selfish and exploitative mediums), and masturbation as the sexual expression of a fuller yearning for connectedness, i.e., connectedness that is not primarily sexual", concluding that "Scripture does not directly address masturbation, giving rise to guilt-inducing misconceptions about a behavior that is extremely salient to unmarried college-aged Christian men whose value system leads them to eschew pre-marital sex".

The American Evangelical scholar, Judith K. Balswick, in her book, Authentic Human Sexuality: An Integrated Christian Approach, argues that "Masturbation can be a healthy, enjoyable way for a person without a sexual partner to experience sexual gratification."

Another American Evangelical writer, James B. Nelson, notes in his book, Embodiment: An Approach to Sexuality and Christian Theology, that "The physiological intensity typical in masturbatory orgasm frequently surpasses that of intercourse, and relational fantasies usually accompany the act in compensation for the absence of the partner", implying this is a gift from God for those who lack a spouse.

In the book, Singles Ask: Answers to Questions about Relationships and Sexuality, by Howard Ivan Smith, the Fullerton Evangelical theologian Archibald Hart is quoted as saying that, "I do not believe that masturbation itself is morally wrong, or...sinful."

Masturbation is seen as forbidden by some evangelical pastors because of the sexual thoughts that may accompany it. However, evangelical pastors have pointed out that the practice has been erroneously associated with Onan by scholars, that it is not a sin if it is not practiced with fantasies or compulsively, and that it was useful in a married couple, if his or her partner did not have the same frequency of sexual needs.

Restorationism

Jehovah's Witnesses 
The Jehovah's Witnesses teach that masturbation is a habit that is a "form of uncleanness", one that "fosters attitudes that can be mentally corrupting".

The Church of Jesus Christ of Latter-day Saints 

On many occasions spanning over a century, leaders of The Church of Jesus Christ of Latter-day Saints (LDS Church) have taught that adherents should not masturbate as part of obedience to the code of conduct known as the law of chastity. The Church places great emphasis on the law of chastity, and a commitment to following these sexual standards is required for baptism, receiving and maintaining a temple recommend, and is part of the temple endowment ceremony covenants devout participants promise by oath to keep. While serving as church president, Spencer W. Kimball taught that the law of chastity includes "masturbation...and every hidden and secret sin and all unholy and impure thoughts and practices." Before serving full-time missions, young adults are required to abandon the practice as it is believed to be a gateway sin that dulls sensitivity to the guidance of the Holy Ghost. The first recorded public mention of masturbation by a general church leader to a broad audience was in 1952 by apostle J. Reuben Clark, and recent notable mentions include ones in 2013 and 2016.

Though rhetoric has softened and become less direct, one 1976 study found that the majority of Latter-day Saints' views are at odds with those of top church leaders. However, the prohibition on masturbation remains in place, though its enforcement and the opinions of local leadership vary. During regular worthiness interviews, Latter-day Saints—including teenagers—are encouraged to confess any serious sins (including sexual sins) to a church leader, to help them repent and be worthy to participate in the sacrament and temple rites. Some have even reported being asked specifically about their masturbation habits.

Seventh Day Adventists

Ellen G. White, one of the founders of the Seventh-day Adventist Church, in the mid-19th century said she had spiritual visions from God that gave her guidance on the Christian life. She warned against overly-stimulating foods, sex, and masturbation, which she referred to as "solitary vice." She warned her followers of her visions of disfigured humans and the consequences of masturbation not only destroying one's life, but preventing access to Heaven when Jesus comes in the first resurrection. She said that masturbation was the cause of many sicknesses in adults from cancer to lung disease. White even stated that masturbation claimed many sinners' lives prematurely. She believed that one's diet had a direct correlation with one's urge to masturbate. She said that a healthy diet consisting of fruits, vegetables, wheat breads, and water would lead to a diminished urge to masturbate and thus would lead to a healthier and more fulfilling life. To ultimately produce a guide for future generations she said solitary vice was the cause of hereditary insanity, cancer, and other deadly diseases; clearly appealing to parents to protect their children by not engaging in solitary vice.

Armstrongism
The United Church of God, an Armstrongnite church, believes that "sexual love is the supreme expression of love between a husband and wife and that only this use of the sexual organs glorifies or reflects God's design and purpose." The church also says that, according to 1 Corinthians 6:16,18, any sexual activity outside of marriage is sinful and that according to Matthew 5:27-30, sexually arousing thoughts alone are enough for a person to be guilty of such sin. The church encourages its members to "guard and control their thoughts, as well as their actions."

Islam 

In Islam, masturbation is forbidden or makruh (discouraged) according to the majority of scholars' opinions. However, a minority viewpoint within some Islamic schools of thought permits masturbation as an alternative to zina (fornication), or if one is unable to marry. Bathing (ghusl) is compulsory after any kind of seminal discharge whether through sexual intercourse, masturbation, or nocturnal emissions (wet dream).

Judaism 

Maimonides stated that the Tanakh does not explicitly prohibit masturbation. On the matter of masturbation, the biblical story of Onan is traditionally interpreted by Jews to be about the emitting sperm outside of the vagina and condemnation thereof, applying this story to masturbation, although the Tanakh does not explicitly state that Onan was masturbating. By virtue of Onan, traditional Judaism condemns [male] masturbation.

 states that any male who emits semen is considered ritually impure - whether the emission came through masturbation, nocturnal emission, or sex between married heterosexual partners. The traditional rabbinical interpretation of Leviticus 15 was that it applies to all sperm flows, including sperm flows due to masturbation. Other than this ritual impurity, no consequences or punishments are specified.

Indian and Iranian religions

Hinduism 
Seeking bodily pleasure is only considered condemned for those who dedicate themselves to chastity. There are no references in Hindu religious texts to suggest that masturbation itself desecrates sexual purity. For those who are dedicated to chastity, this sin is absolutely minor, and can be absolved either by taking a bath, or by worshiping the Sun, or by saying three prayers.

Buddhism 

The most used formulation of Buddhist ethics are the Five Precepts. These precepts take the form of voluntary personal undertakings, not divine mandate or instruction. The third precept is "to refrain from committing sexual misconduct". However, different schools of Buddhism have differing interpretations of what constitutes sexual misconduct.

Buddhism was advanced by Gautama Buddha as a method by which human beings could end dukkha (suffering) and escape samsara (cyclic existence). Normally this entails practicing meditation and following the Four Noble Truths and the Noble Eightfold Path as a way to subdue the passions which, along with the skandhas, cause suffering and rebirth. Masturbation (Pali: sukkavissaṭṭhi) is accordingly seen as problematic for a person who wishes to attain liberation. According to a lecture by Lama Thubten Zopa Rinpoche, it is important to abstain from "sexual intercourse, including masturbation, any action that brings an orgasm and so forth, because this results in a rebirth." He clarifies: "Generally, the action that is the opposite of the precept brings the opposite negative result, takes us further from enlightenment, and keeps us longer in samsara."

Shravasti Dhammika, a Theravadin monk, cites the Vinaya Pitaka in his online "Guide to Buddhism A to Z", and states the following:

His opinions regarding non-Buddhists notwithstanding, the Buddha did encourage his serious disciples to limit their sexual behaviour or to embrace celibacy. Indeed, emphasis on chastity in Buddhism is strong for bhikkhus and bhikkhunis (renunciates), who vow to follow the rules of the Vinaya. Not only are monastics celibate, but they also take more and stricter vows in order to conquer their desires. In the Theravadin tradition, masturbation is also stressed as being harmful for upāsakas and upāsikās (lay devotees) who practice the Eight Precepts on Uposatha days, leading a more ascetic lifestyle that does not allow for masturbation. Indeed, masturbation is explicitly not characterised as sexual misconduct in the mahāyāna Upāsakaśīla sūtra:

Nevertheless, some contemporary writers on Buddhism suggest that masturbation is essentially harmless for a layperson.

Zoroastrianism 
The act of masturbation is known as Shoeythra Gunaah, or Shoithra-gunah, which can also be used to refer to onanism.

The Zoroastrian holy book Avesta, with its stress on physical cleanliness, lists voluntary masturbation among the unpardonable sins that one can commit. This view was supported by James R. Russell. The Verses 26-28 of Fargard VIII, Section V of the Vendidad state

The scholar Sorabji Edalji Dubash has also written:

Masturbation is also considered a Drujih-i-Buji which is caused by the menstrual discharge of a woman if proper precautions are not followed. Thus also enumerated in the Expiatory prayer of Dasturan Dastur Adarbad Mahrespand fall under Drujih-i-Buji. A right knowledge of Drujih-i-Buji and of the ill-effects is said to save young boys of the age of puberty from the fangs of masturbation.

In the story of Jamshid and Taxmoruw (Tahmuras) preserved in a Parsi rivayat, Ahriman is shown to be a masturbator.

Zoroastrian hell is also said to have sinners forced to defecate and masturbate continually.

East Asian religions

Taoism 
Some teachers and practitioners of Traditional Chinese medicine, Taoist meditative and martial arts say that masturbation can cause a lowered energy level in men. They say that ejaculation in this way reduces "origin qi" from dantian, the energy center located in the lower abdomen. Some maintain that sex with a partner does not do this because the partners replenish each other's qi. Some practitioners therefore say that males should not practice martial arts for at least 48 hours after masturbation while others prescribe up to six months, because the loss of Origin Qi does not allow new qi to be created for this kind of time.

Some Taoists strongly discouraged female masturbation. Women were encouraged to practice massaging techniques upon themselves, but were also instructed to avoid thinking sexual thoughts if experiencing a feeling of pleasure. Otherwise, the woman's "labia will open wide and the sexual secretions will flow." If this happened, the woman would lose part of her life force, and this could bring illness and shortened life.

Wicca 
Wicca, like other religions, has adherents with a spectrum of views ranging from conservative to liberal. Wicca is generally undogmatic, and nothing in Wiccan philosophy prohibits masturbation. On the contrary, Wiccan ethics, summed up in the Wiccan Rede "An it harm none, do as thou wilt", are interpreted by many as endorsing responsible sexual activity of all varieties. This is reinforced in the Charge of the Goddess, a key piece of Wiccan literature, in which the Goddess says, "all acts of love and pleasure are my rituals".

Bibliography
Wile, Douglas. The Art of the Bedchamber: The Chinese Sexual Yoga Classics including Women's Solo Meditation Texts. Albany: State University of New York, 1992.
Numbers, Ronald L, "Sex, Science, and Salvation: The Sexual Advice of Ellen G. White and John Harvey Kellogg," in Right Living: An Anglo-American Tradition of Self—Help Medicine and Hygiene ed. Charles Rosenberg, 2003.

See also

Chastity
Fornication
Religion and sexuality
Religious views on pornography

References